Akbarsho Iskandarov (born 1 August 1951) is a Tajik politician who was twice acting president of Tajikistan. He first served as acting president from October 6, 1991, to December 2, 1991, when Rahmon Nabiyev stepped down to fight Tajikistan's first presidential election. Nabiyev won the election and took over as the first popularly elected president in the country's history, but resigned in September 1992, following a coup d'état. Iskandrov again took the interim presidency and later resigned on 20 November 1992, after which the office of president was abolished and Emomali Rahmon was installed as head of state. Iskandrov also served as ambassador to Turkmenistan and Kazakhstan.

References

Presidents of Tajikistan
Heads of state of Tajikistan
Living people
1951 births
People from Gorno-Badakhshan Autonomous Region
Leaders who took power by coup
Ambassadors of Tajikistan to Turkmenistan
Ambassadors of Tajikistan to Kazakhstan